Royal Designer for Industry is a distinction established by the British Royal Society of Arts (RSA) in 1936, to encourage a high standard of industrial design and enhance the status of designers. It is awarded to people who have achieved "sustained excellence in aesthetic and efficient design for industry". Those who are British citizens take the letters RDI after their names, while those who are not become Honorary RDIs (HonRDI). Everyone who holds the distinction is a Member of The Faculty of Royal Designers for Industry (founded in 1938).

Their work is diverse, ranging from fashion to engineering, theatre to product design, graphics to environmental design.

New RDIs are elected annually and the Faculty continues to support initiatives to further excellence in design, including an annual Summer School for innovative young designers.

Only 200 designers may hold the distinction RDI at any time and it is regarded as the highest honour to be obtained in the United Kingdom in a diverse range of design disciplines including the field of industrial design. In addition, the RSA may confer HonRDI titles up to a maximum of half the number of people who currently hold the distinction RDI.

New RDIs are awarded Diplomas each year at the annual RDI Dinner. Every two years a new Master of the Faculty is elected by the past Masters, who include Dinah Casson, Mike Dempsey, Sir Kenneth Grange, Geoffrey Harcourt, Martin Hunt, Timothy O’Brien, Chris Wise, Malcolm Garrett and Tristram Carfrae. The current Master is Mark Major.

Current members
The list identifies current RDIs, the date of their award, and the category of design for which they were honoured.

RDIs

HonRDIs

Former members

Past RDIs
Past Royal Designers for Industry
 Tony Abbott, Television & theatre design, 1972
 Ken Adam, Film production design, 2009
 Edward Ardizzone, Illustration, 1974
 Hardy Amies, Dress design, 1964
 Edward Abbott, Illustration, 1974
 Jon Bannenberg, Motor yachts, 1978
 Christian Barnard, Transport equipment, 1948
 Edward Bawden, Graphics, 1949
 Gerald Benney, Silversmithing, 1971
 Misha Black, Exhibitions & interiors, 1957
 John Box, Film production design, 1992
 Bill Brandt, Photography, 1978
 William Brown, Bridge design, 1977
 Stefan Buzas, Exhibitions & interiors, 1961
 Reco Capey, General design, 1937
 Andy Cameron, Interactive design, 2011
 Hugh Casson, Exhibitions, 1961
 Achille Castiglioni, General design, 1986
 Hulme Chadwick, Product design, 1974
 Colin Chapman, Automotive design, 1979
 Wells Coates, General design, 1944
 Christopher Cockerell, Engineering design, 1987
 Douglas Cockerell, Bookbinding, 1936
 Susie Cooper, Pottery, 1940
 Kay Cosserat, Textile design, 1986
 Edward Gordon Craig, Stage design, 1937
 Gordon Cullen, Illustration & townscape design, 1975
 Robin Day, Furniture & exhibitions, 1959
 Lucienne Day, Textiles, 1962
 Richard Eckersley, Book design, 1999
 Tom Eckersley, Posters, 1963
 Alan Fletcher, Graphics & publicity design, 1972
 Uffa Fox, Small boats, 1955
 Barnett Freedman, Graphics, 1949
 Roger Furse, Stage & film design, 1949
 Abram Games, Posters, 1959
 James Gardner, Exhibitions, 1947
 J Laurent Giles, Yachts, 1951
 Eric Gill, Typography & wood engraving, 1936
 Robert Goodden, General design, 1947
 Duncan Grant, Printed textiles, 1941
 Eileen Gray, Furniture & interiors, 1972
 Milner Gray, Packaging, 1937
 E W Grieve, Shop window display, 1940
 Jacqueline Groag, Textile design, 1964
 Edmund Happold, Engineering design, 1983
 Geoffrey de Havilland, Aircraft, 1944
 Ashley Havinden, Graphics, 1947
 Lionel Haworth, Engineering design, 1976
 Ambrose Heal, Furniture, 1939
 F H K Henrion, Packaging & graphics, 1959
 Jocelyn Herbert, Theatre & cinema design, 1971
 Robert Heritage, Furniture, 1963
 George Him, Graphic design, 1977
 James Hogan, Glass & stained glass, 1936
 Paul Hogarth, Illustration, 1979
 Charles Holden, Transport equipment, 1943
 Jack Howe, Products and industrial equipment, 1961
 Allen Hutt, Typographic & Newspaper design, 1970
 James Irvine, Product design, 2004
 Laurence Irving, date tbc
 Alec Issigonis, Motor cars, 1964
 Ralph Koltai, Theatre design, 1984
 Natasha Kroll, Shop display and television design, 1966
 Lynton Lamb, Book design & illustration, 1974
 Osbert Lancaster, Illustration, 1979
 Margaret Leischner, Textiles, 1969
 Richard Levin, Television design, 1971
 Noel London, Engineering product design, 1973
 William Lyons, Motor cars, 1964
 Ethel Mairet, Woven textiles, 1937 (first woman)
 Eric de Maré, Photography, 1997
 Enid Marx, Pattern design, 1944
 J H Mason, 1936
 James McNeill, Ships, 1950
 David Mellor, Silver, cutlery & lighting, 1962
 Percy Metcalfe, Medals & coinage, 1937
 Francis Meynell, Typography, 1940
 Bill Moggridge, Product design, 1988
 Edward Molyneux, Dress, 1950
 Stanley Morison, Type design & typography, 1960
 Alastair Morton, textiles, 1960
 Alex Moulton, Engineering Products, 1968
 Jean Muir, Dress design, 1972
 H G Murphy, Goldsmithing, 1936
 Keith Murray, Glass, pottery & silver, 1936
 Charles Nicholson, Yachts, 1944
 Julia Trevelyan Oman, Theatre & film design, 1977
 Brian O'Rorke, Interiors, 1939
 Eric Carlton Ottaway, Road passenger vehicles, 1949
 Derek Prime, Engineering design, 1982
 Ian Proctor, Boats & small craft, 1969
 Tom Purvis, Commercial art, 1936
 Ernest Race, Furniture, 1953
 A B Read, Light fittings, 1940
 A A Rubbra, Engineering design, 1977
 Gordon Russell, Furniture, 1940
 R D Russell, Furniture, 1944
 Hans Schleger, Exhibition display & packaging, 1959
 Hans Schmoller, Typography, 1976
 Douglas Scott, Industrial designer, 1974
 Ronald Searle, Illustration, 1991
 George Sheringham, Interior decoration & textiles, 1936
 Peter Simpson, Woven Textile design, 1974
 Percy Delf Smith, Lettering, 1940
 Antony Armstrong-Jones, 1st Earl of Snowdon, Photography, 1986
 Basil Spence, Exhibitions & interiors, 1960
 Herbert Spencer, Typography, 1965
 Harold Stabler, Pottery, Enamelling & silversmithing, 1936
 Richard Stevens, Product design, 1973
 Reynolds Stone, Lettering, 1956
 Marianne Straub, Woven textiles, 1972
 Derek Sugden, Engineering design, 2009
 Fred Taylor, Graphics, 1936
 Philip Thompson, Graphics & illustration, 1997
 Walter Tracy, Type design, 1973
 Howard Upjohn, Engineering product design, 1973
 C F A Voysey, Interior decoration, furniture & fabrics, 1936
 Barnes Wallis, Aircraft, 1943
 Allan Walton, Printed textiles, 1940
 Neville Ward, Interior design & ship interiors, 1971
 John Waterer, Leather Goods, 1953
 Hans Wegner, Furniture, 1969
 Robert Welch, Product design & silversmithing, 1965
 Frank Whittle, Engineering design, 1985
 Berthold Wolpe, Typefaces & lettering, 1959
 Anna Zinkeisen, Graphics & mural painting, 1940

Past Honorary RDIs
Past Honorary Royal Designers for Industry
 Edward McKnight Kauffer, Commercial art, 1936
 Alvar Aalto, General design, 1947
 Franco Albini, Interiors, exhibitions & furniture, 1971
 Gordon Andrews, General design, 1987
 Saul Bass, Film & TV graphics, 1964
 Herbert Bayer, Graphic design, 1984
 Richard Buckminster Fuller, Architecture & design, 1980
 Nanna Ditzel, Product design, 1996
 Charles Eames, Furniture, exhibitions & interiors, 1960
 Jean-Michel Folon, Illustration, 1981
 André François, Graphics 1974
 Shigeo Fukada, Graphic design, 1986
 Alexander Girard, Interiors, exhibitions & furnishing textiles, 1965
 Walter Gropius, General design, 1947
 Edward Hald, Glass, 1939
 Walter Herdeg, Graphic design, 1976
 Christian Joachim, Pottery, 1939
 CL 'Kelly' Johnson, Aircraft design, 1984
 Finn Juhl, Furniture & interiors, 1978
 Dora Jung, Woven textiles, 1979
 Kaare Klint, Furniture, 1949
 Takashi Kono, Graphics, 1983
 Raymond Loewy, General design, 1939
 Vico Magistretti, General design, 1992
 Pierre Mendell, Graphic design, 1999
 Bruno Mathsson, Furniture, 1978
 Herbert Matter, Graphics & photography, 1982
 Norman McLaren, Film Animation, 1986
 Børge Mogensen, Furniture, 1972
 Josef Muller-Brockmann, Graphic design, 1988
 George Nelson, General design, 1973
 Marcello Nizzoli, Typewriters & calculating machines, 1961
 Antti Nurmesniemi, General design, 1986
 Sigurd Persson, General design, 1987
 Battista Farina, Motor cars, 1954
 Paul Rand, Graphics, 1973
 Steen Eiler Rasmussen, General design, 1947
 Astrid Sampe, Textile design, 1949
 WHJB Sandberg, Exhibition & museum display, typography, 1971
 Timo Sarpaneva, Pottery & textiles, 1963
 Carlo Scarpa, Exhibitions, interiors & museum design, 1969
 Saul Steinberg, Illustration, 1980
 Olin Stephens, Yacht design, 1975
 Josef Svoboda, Theatre design, 1989
 Ilmari Tapiovaara, Furniture, 1969
 Walter Dorwin Teague, General design, 1951
 Henryk Tomaszewski, Graphics, 1975
 Roland Topor, Illustration, 1988
 Jan Tschichold, Typography & book design, 1965
 Dame Vivienne Westwood DBE, Fashion design, 2001
 Tapio Wirkkala, Glass, wood & silver, 1964
 Henry Wolf, Graphic design, 1990
 Piet Zwart, Typography, 1966

References

External links
 
 University of Brighton Design Archives

1936 establishments in the United Kingdom
Awards established in 1936
Royal Society of Arts
Design awards